Aniello Califano (19 January 1870 in Sorrento – 20 February 1919 in Sant'Egidio del Monte Albino) was an Italian poet and writer. He was the author of numerous Neapolitan songs, the music to which was composed by various Neapolitan composers.  A number of his songs, especially "'O surdato 'nnammurato", remain popular today.

Califano was born in Sorrento, the son of Alfonso Califano, an important landowner from Sant'Egidio del Monte Albino; his mother, Rosa Ruspoli, was a member of the local nobility. He was an only child. He attended San Lorenzo until the age of 18, returning in September 1916.  He died in 1919.

Marcello Fondato used some of his work in the 1970 film Ninì Tirabusciò: la donna che inventò la mossa.

Songs
"Ammore bbello" - Music by Francesco Paolo Frontini (1898)
"'O surdato 'nnammurato" - Music by Enrico Cannio (1915)
"Tiempe belle" - Music by Vincenzo Valente (1926) 
"A Psiche"

References 

1870 births
1919 deaths
Italian poets
Italian male poets
People from Sorrento